Allure is a 2017 Canadian psychological thriller film written and directed by Carlos and Jason Sanchez in their feature film debut. It stars Evan Rachel Wood, Julia Sarah Stone, and Denis O'Hare.

It originally premiered under the title A Worthy Companion at the 2017 Toronto International Film Festival. In December, TIFF included the film on its annual Canada's Top Ten list of the ten best Canadian films.

Plot
Laura Drake (Evan Rachel Wood) is an emotionally disturbed young woman who works as a house-cleaner for her father's company in an urban environment. One day, Laura meets an unhappy teenager named Eva (Julia Sarah Stone) while on the job. The pair form an unexpected connection, and Laura eventually convinces Eva to leave her oppressive mother and move in with her. Though the relationship initially works, Laura's anxiety soon makes her abusive and controlling, creating an unstable bond between the two women.

Cast

Reception
On review aggregator website Rotten Tomatoes, the film holds an approval rating of 46% based on 28 reviews, and an average rating of 5.88/10. The website's critical consensus reads, "Allure has visual style and an intriguing Evan Rachel Wood on its side, but a clumsily told story leaves this sexually charged thriller less than the sum of its parts." On Metacritic, the film has a weighted average score of 54 out of 100, based on 11 critics, indicating "mixed or average reviews".

The Sanchez brothers received a nomination for the Directors Guild of Canada's DGC Discovery Award.

References

External links
 

2017 films
2017 directorial debut films
2017 independent films
2017 LGBT-related films
2017 psychological thriller films
2017 thriller drama films
Canadian independent films
Canadian LGBT-related films
Canadian psychological thriller films
Canadian thriller drama films
English-language Canadian films
Films shot in Montreal
Lesbian-related films
LGBT-related thriller drama films
2010s English-language films
2010s Canadian films